In speech pathology and medicine, nasoendoscopy is the endoscopic examination of the velopharynx, or  the nose, often with a CCD camera or a fiber optic camera on a flexible tube passed through the nostril. It can provide information to evaluate speech and velopharyngeal function or dysfunction, as in diseases such as sinonasal carcinomas.

Procedure

Indications
After removal of nasal packing following epistaxis, routine nasoendoscopy is not necessarily indicated. However, widely accepted indications for nasoendoscopy include:
abnormal speech characteristics: hypernasal resonance, excessive nasal airflow including nasal air escape and nasal turbulence (also called nasal rustle), and absence of or weak intra-oral air pressure for oral pressure consonants;
limited progress with speech therapy to establish oral pressure sounds;
difficulty maintaining intra-oral air pressure and velopharyngeal closure during speech;
patient has known or suspected abnormality of palate or velopharynx; and,
patient is being considered for pharyngoplasty, maxillary advancement or speech prosthesis.

Contraindications, complications, and safety
No absolute contraindications exist for nasoendoscopy; and, while the procedure is relatively safe, the exact risk of the procedure depends on the skill and experience of the endoscope operator.

References

External links
Nasendoscopy - Macmillan Cancer Support

Endoscopy
Medical diagnosis
Nose
Speech and language pathology